Horama grotei is a moth of the subfamily Arctiinae. It was described by Arthur Gardiner Butler in 1876. It is found on Jamaica. This species was named in honor of Augustus Radcliffe Grote.

References

 Arctiidae genus list at Butterflies and Moths of the World of the Natural History Museum

Euchromiina
Moths described in 1876

Taxa named by Arthur Gardiner Butler